Mahaadev is a 1989 Indian Hindi-language action film directed by Raj N. Sippy. It stars Vinod Khanna, Meenakshi Sheshadri, Raj Babbar in pivotal roles. The film score and soundtrack were composed by Ilaiyaraaja.

Cast

Vinod Khanna as Inspector Arjun Singh
Meenakshi Seshadri as Geeta
Raj Babbar as Kishan
Sonu Walia
Shakti Kapoor
Anupam Kher as Mahesh
Kiran Kumar as Umesh 
Sharat Saxena
Mahesh Anand
Anjan Srivastav
Beena Banerjee as Radha
Ashalata Wabgaonkar
Tej Sapru
Ram Mohan as Mishra
Satish Shah as Bansilal
Gulshan Grover
Vikas Anand as Ramlal
Mohan Choti as Mohan

Music
The soundtrack features six songs. All songs were written by Farooq Qaisar, while "Mujhe Bahon Mein Bhar Ke" was written by Gulshan Bawra.

References

External links
 

1989 films
1980s Hindi-language films
Films scored by Ilaiyaraaja
1980s masala films
Films directed by Raj N. Sippy